Kolam Ayer Constituency (SMC) was a constituency in Singapore. It used to exist from 1976 to 1988, where Sidek bin Saniff was Member of Parliament. It merged with another 2 SMCs in 1988 to form the Eunos Group Representation Constituency.

Member of Parliament

Elections

Elections in the 1970s

Elections in the 1980s

References

Singaporean electoral divisions
Kallang